Cafe Mondegar (a.k.a. Café Mondegar and Mondy's) is a popular landmark and touristic attraction of Mumbai. Famous Indian cartoonist and painter Mario Miranda painted murals (his cartoons) on all inner walls and entrance ceiling of the restaurant.

History
Cafe Mondegar was started in 1932 by Iranian Zoroastrians (Parsi settlers in India) as an Irani café. The current building (Metro House), then housed a hotel called Apollo Hotel and the café was started in the reception area of the hotel. By the mid 20th century, the café introduced a jukebox, (first in Mumbai) and was simultaneously converted into a restaurant. By the 1990s, Cafe Mondegar was refurbished, Mario Miranda's murals were painted on the walls & ceiling, and the restaurant was converted into a bar. Café is owned by Yazdegardi family and Rusi Yazdegardi / Hoshang Yazdegardi are the Managing partners of the business.

Location
Cafe Mondegar is situated in the Metro House in Colaba Causeway, 450 meters North-West of Gateway of India, 200 meters North-East of Leopold Cafe and 400 meters South of Elphinstone College in Mumbai.

Murals
In the 1990s, Rusi Yazdegardi (owner) asked Mario Miranda to draw murals (cartoons) on two opposite walls; i.e. wall adjacent to the main entrance and wall opposite the main entrance. Both walls have different themes. Whilst one wall is dedicated to Life in Mumbai, the other wall is dedicated to Atmosphere in the Café.

Mario Miranda sketched his drawings on canvas before their being rendered on the restaurant walls with the help of students from Sir J.J. Institute of Applied Art under his supervision.

See also

 Irani café
 Leopold Cafe
 Mario Miranda

References

Coffeehouses and cafés in India
Restaurants in Mumbai
Indian companies established in 1932
Murals in India
Restaurants established in 1932